Poojakkedukkatha Pookkal is a 1977 Indian Malayalam-language film, directed by N. Sankaran Nair and produced by Prem Navas and Sobhana Parameswaran Nair. The film stars Madhu, Sheela, Jagathy Sreekumar and Adoor Bhasi. The film's score was composed by K. Raghavan.

Cast
Madhu
Sheela
Jagathy Sreekumar
Adoor Bhasi
Prem Nawas
Unnimary
Bahadoor
Mallika Sukumaran
P. K. Venukkuttan Nair

Soundtrack
The music was composed by K. Raghavan with lyrics by P. Bhaskaran and Swathi Thirunal.

References

External links
 

1977 films
1970s Malayalam-language films
Films scored by K. Raghavan
Films directed by N. Sankaran Nair